Scott Dunn may refer to:
Scott Dunn (baseball) (born 1978), Major League Baseball pitcher
Scott Dunn (tour operator), a luxury tour operator

Other uses
Scott Dunn Polar Challenge

Dunn, Scott